Future Coalition is an American nonprofit organization consisting of a national network of youth-led organizations and initiatives centered around creating social change.

About 
Future Coalition is a coalition of over 60 youth-led activist organizations focused on social change. It was co-founded by two of the main organizations that grew out of the response to the shootings in Parkland, FL, 50 Miles More and National School Walkout. The Future Coalition has been incubated by March On, the coalition of Women's Marches, as their “youth arm.” 

Katie Eder, founder of the organization 50 Miles More, is the executive director and founding member of the organization.

Coalition 
The coalition consists of 100 youth-led activist organizations focused on issues such as gun violence prevention, climate change, and social and racial justice. They include: 18by Vote, National Youth Rights Association,  Bridge the Divide, Sunrise Movement, Box the Ballot, Students for Gun Legislation, Chicago Fuerte, Coalition of Students, DC Teens Action, Embracing Green, Global Minds, Indivisible Students, iMatter, March For Our Lives National, Moco4Change, March for Our Lives, National Die In, National School Walkout, Orange Generation, Parents Promise to Kids, Platform, Redefy, Shattering the Silence, Student Voice, Team Enough, Triangle People Power, Youth Empower, Zero Hour, and 50 Miles More.

Walkout to Vote 
In September 2018, Future Coalition launched the #WalkoutToVote, a campaign with the goal of getting every eligible young person to vote in the 2018 midterm elections by encouraging them to walk out of their classrooms on election day and march to the polls to cast their ballots. Over 500 individual student-led walkouts took place in schools across the country. The campaign was supported on social media by Hillary Clinton, Snoop Dogg, Piper Perabo, Sarah Silverman, Bobby Umar, Debra Messing, Jane Lynch, Jon Cooper, Eric Swalwell, and HJ Benjamin and was credited with influencing high voter turnout among young people in the 2018 midterms.

September 20 Climate Strike 
Future Coalition was involved in helping organize the September 20 Climate Strike, an international strike and protest led by young people and adults held three days before the UN Climate Summit in NYC on September 20 across the US and world to demand action be taken to address the climate crisis. The event is one of the largest climate mobilizations in US history. The event is a part of the school strike for climate movement.

Earth Day Live 
Future Coalition organized Earth Day Live, a three-day livestream commemorating the 50th anniversary of Earth Day in the United States. The event was streamed online as part of efforts to promote social distancing during the COVID-19 pandemic. It is being referred to as the largest online mass mobilization in history.

References

External links 

Non-profit organizations based in the United States
Organizations established in 2018
Youth-led organizations
2018 establishments in the United States